Utricularia nigrescens is a terrestrial carnivorous plant that belongs to the genus Utricularia (family Lentibulariaceae). It is endemic to Brazil.

See also 
 List of Utricularia species

References 

Carnivorous plants of South America
Flora of Brazil
nigrescens
Plants described in 1908